Bahri Ahmet Kavaja (23 August 1924 – 19 August 1987) was an Albanian football player who played for Vllaznia Shkodër and Dinamo Tirana as well as the Albania national team.

International career
He made his debut for Albania in an October 1946 Balkan Championship match against Yugoslavia and earned a total of 13 caps, scoring no goals. His final international was a June 1950 friendly match against Bulgaria.

Defection
In September 1950 after a game in Hungary, he escaped his team along with Sulejman (Bule) Vathi after swimming the strait of Bosphorus, and did not return to the Communist regime in Albania, eventually settling in New Zealand. He became a naturalised New Zealand citizen in 1965, and died in Adelaide, South Australia, on 19 August 1987.

Honours
Albanian Superliga: 1
 1950

References

1924 births
1987 deaths
Footballers from Shkodër
Albanian footballers
Naturalised citizens of New Zealand
Albanian defectors
Association football defenders
Albania international footballers
KF Vllaznia Shkodër players
FK Dinamo Tirana players
Kategoria Superiore players
Albanian expatriates in New Zealand